Botanic Gardens MRT station is an underground Mass Rapid Transit (MRT) interchange station on the Downtown line and Circle line in Tanglin, Singapore, located at the junction of Bukit Timah Road and Cluny Park Road.

The station is located at the northwestern corner of the Singapore Botanic Gardens, where it was named after. It is the nearest MRT station to the Bukit Timah campus of the National University of Singapore. As Bukit Brown MRT station is currently non-operational, the section of tracks between Botanic Gardens station and Caldecott MRT station is the longest between any two stations on the Circle line.

History
The station was first announced as Adam station when the Circle Line (CCL) Stages 4 and 5 stations were revealed in 2003. The contract for the construction and completion of Adam and Farrer stations (including  of twin bored tunnels was awarded to Taisei Corporation for approximately S$391 million in July 2004.

Public consultation of the station began in January 2006 and only two names were selected - Botanic Gardens and Cluny Road. Botanic Gardens was eventually selected because this station also connects to the popular UNESCO World Heritage Site. Cluny Road was also selected because it was around the location of a former railway station "Cluny Road" that closed down in 1930s. On 12 September that year, the final name of Botanic Gardens was chosen due to it being a popular offered choice by those who polled.

Construction of the Circle line station began on 10 March 2005. It had acquired some of the Botanic Gardens, but restored on 10 March 2010. The station opened on 8 October 2011.

Downtown line

The station was first announced to be an interchange station with the DTL when the DTL2 (Downtown line Stage 2) stations were unveiled on 15 July 2008. The contract also includes the construction of the adjacent Stevens station. Construction of the station was scheduled to commence in the third quarter of 2009 and targeted to complete by 2015. On 11 March 2012, a worker was killed at a site near the Botanic Gardens, beside the contractor's site office after a concrete slab fell on him. 35-year-old Masud al-Mamun was operating an excavator deep in the ground when the slab fell on him. Rescuers had to use a breaking tool kit to break a portion of the concrete slab. It took nearly five hours to reach the man lying motionless on the ground. This was the first casualty related case in the construction of the Downtown line. The station opened on 27 December 2015 along with the other DTL2 stations.

Art in Transit
The artwork featured in the Circle line section under the Art in Transit programme is Aquatic Fauna No. 1 by Kai Lam and Chua Chye Teck. The mural, displayed above the platform doors, contains symbolic imageries of water and aquatic animals using the Chinese paper cutting technique. The "fauna" mural not only highlights the station's proximity to the Botanic Gardens, but also complements the 2-storey high water-cascading wall in the station, the first to have such a feature within the station.

The Downtown line section features the artwork "What is a Tree?" by Shirley Soh. Various vistas of the Tembusu on the front lawn of the Botanic Gardens are created to pose the ontological questions.

References

Bibliography

External links

 

Railway stations in Singapore opened in 2011
Tanglin
Mass Rapid Transit (Singapore) stations